The 2023 Lincoln, Nebraska mayoral election will be held on May 2, 2023 to determine the mayor of Lincoln, Nebraska. It will be preceded by a primary election on April 4 where the top two vote-getters, regardless of party affiliation, advance to the general election. Incumbent Democratic mayor Leirion Gaylor Baird is running for reelection to a second term in office. The election will be officially nonpartisan.

Primary election

Declared
Leirion Gaylor Baird, incumbent mayor (2019–present) (Party affiliation: Democratic)
Suzanne Geist, Nebraska state senator (2017–present) (Party affiliation: Republican)
Stan Parker, Christian radio executive and former University of Nebraska football player (Party affiliation: Republican)

Declined
Jack Riggins, KLIN radio host (Party affiliation: Republican)

Endorsements

Results

References

External links 
Official campaign websites
 Leirion Gaylor Baird (D) for Mayor
 Suzanne Geist (R) for Mayor
 Stan Parker (R) for Mayor

Local elections in Nebraska
2023 United States mayoral elections
History of Lincoln, Nebraska
2023 Nebraska elections